Ficus mutabilis is a species of plant in the family Moraceae. It is endemic to New Caledonia.

References

mutabilis
Endemic flora of New Caledonia
Trees of New Caledonia
Taxonomy articles created by Polbot